The San Isidro Cathedral is located in the city of San Isidro, in the province of Buenos Aires, Argentina. It is at 16200th Del Libertador Avenue, opposite Plaza Mitre or Plaza de San Isidro in San Isidro's historic quarter.

History 
Built on the site of a 1706 chapel opened by the city's founder, Captain Domingo de Acassuso, the cathedral was designed by French architects Dunant and Paquin, and inaugurated on July 14, 1898.

Architecture 

Constructed in neogothic style, it stands 68 m (223 ft) tall. Its base is a Latin cross. Its walls are built from materials like rock and bricks, and it has stained glass windows. The cathedral underwent a restoration project which was completed in 2007.

San Isidro fest 
Isidore the Labourer festival is celebrated on 15 May each year.

Interesting places nearby the cathedral

Artisan fair 

Nearly 100 metres in front of the cathedral is the Plaza de San Isidro, and on it, is the San Isidro artisan fair since 1971. This fair has 100 stands, where people can buy leather, wood, textile, metal and ceramic products.

The "San Isidro Artisan Fair" is oldest in the Buenos Aires Province.

San Isidro station 
Two hundred metres off the cathedral is the San Isidro railway station, of the rail transport company Tren de la Costa. This station includes a trade center, cinema and restaurants among other things.

See also 

 Colegio Nacional de San Isidro
 Tren de la Costa
 San Isidro Partido

External links 
 San Isidro Cathedral official website.
 San Isidro Cathedral map.
 Images of the front of the Cathedral.

National Historic Monuments of Argentina
Roman Catholic cathedrals in Buenos Aires Province
Roman Catholic churches completed in 1898
19th-century Roman Catholic church buildings in Argentina
San Isidro, Buenos Aires
Gothic Revival church buildings in Argentina
Buildings and structures in Buenos Aires Province
Tourist attractions in Buenos Aires Province
1706 establishments in the Spanish Empire